Depressaria indecorella is a moth of the family Depressariidae. It is found in Russia.

The wingspan is about 21 mm.

References

External links
lepiforum.de

Moths described in 1917
Depressaria
Moths of Europe